The U.S. state of Alaska has very permissive gun laws, and very few regulations regarding the sale, possession, and use of firearms and ammunition compared to those in most of the contiguous United States. Alaska was the first state to adopt carry laws modeled after those of Vermont, where no license is required to carry a handgun either openly or concealed. However, permits are still issued to residents, allowing reciprocity with other states and exemption from the Federal Gun Free School Zone Act. The legal stipulation that gun permits are issued but not required is referred to by gun rights advocates as an "Alaska carry," as opposed to a "Vermont carry" (or "Constitutional carry"), where gun licenses are neither issued nor required. Some city ordinances do not permit concealed carry without a license, but these have been invalidated by the recent state preemption statute.

Alaska prohibits any type of carry in schools, domestic violence shelters, courts, and correctional institutions. Carrying is also prohibited in any place where alcohol is served for on-site consumption, with an exception for restaurants that serve alcohol, as long as one is not consuming alcohol while carrying.  When encountering a police officer, a person carrying a concealed weapon is required by law to inform the officer they are carrying, and to cooperate if the officer chooses to temporarily seize the gun for the length of the encounter. The possession of any firearm while intoxicated is illegal.

On July 9, 2010, Governor Sean Parnell signed the Alaska Firearms Freedom Act (HB 186), declaring that certain firearms and accessories are exempt from federal regulation and made it unlawful for any state assets to go toward the enforcement of federal gun laws, an act of de facto nullification. The text can be read here. On September 10, 2013, Governor Parnell signed HB 69, which amended and expanded HB 186. The text can be read here.

Summary table

References

Alaska law
Alaska